Senderk Rural District is a rural district (dehestan) in the Senderk District of Minab County, Hormozgan Province, Iran. At the 2006 census, its population (including Senderk, which was subsequently detached from the rural district, and promoted to city status) was 9,871, in 2,095 families; excluding Senderk, the populated (as of 2006) was 8,587, in 1,818 families.  The rural district has 31 villages.

References 

Rural Districts of Hormozgan Province
Minab County